The year 1607 in science and technology involved some significant events.

Astronomy
 Johannes Kepler records the appearance and motion of a comet, later to be known as Comet Halley.

Medicine
 Giovanni Antonio Magini defends the use of astrology in medicine in his De astrologica ratione (published in Venice).

Technology
 Howitzers are invented, by a Frenchman.

Zoology
 Edward Topsell's bestiary The Historie of Foure-Footed Beasts is published in London by William Jaggard.

Births
 between 31 October and 6 December – Pierre de Fermat, French mathematician (d. 1665)

Deaths
 6 January – Guidobaldo del Monte, Italian mathematician (born 1545)
 28 June – Domenico Fontana, Italian architect (born 1543)
 22 August – Bartholomew Gosnold, English explorer and privateer (born 1572)
 Georg Bartisch, German physician and ophthalmologist (born 1535)

References

 
17th century in science
1600s in science